Churchill College is a constituent college of the University of Cambridge in Cambridge, England. It has a primary focus on science, engineering and technology, but retains a strong interest in the arts and humanities.

In 1958, a trust was established with Sir Winston Churchill as its chairman of trustees, to build and endow a college for 60 fellows and 540 students as a national and Commonwealth memorial to Winston Churchill; its Royal Charter and Statutes were approved by the Queen Elizabeth II, in August 1960. It is situated on the outskirts of Cambridge, away from the traditional centre of the city, but close to the University's main new development zone (which now houses the Centre for Mathematical Sciences). It has  of grounds, the largest area of the Cambridge colleges.

Churchill was the first formerly all-male college to decide to admit women, and was among three men's colleges to admit its first women students in 1972. Within 15 years all others had followed suit. The college has a reputation for relative informality compared with other Cambridge colleges, and traditionally admits a larger proportion of its undergraduates from state schools.

The college motto is "Forward", which was taken from the final phrase of Winston Churchill's first speech to the House of Commons as Prime Minister of the United Kingdom, known as the "blood, toil, tears and sweat" speech in which Churchill said, "Come, then, let us go forward together".

History 
In 1955, on holiday in Sicily soon after his resignation as prime minister, Winston Churchill discussed with Sir John Colville and Lord Cherwell the possibility of founding a new institution. Churchill had been impressed by the United States' Massachusetts Institute of Technology and wanted a British version, but the plans evolved into the more modest proposal of creating a science and technology-based college within the University of Cambridge. Churchill wanted a mix of non-scientists to ensure a well-rounded education and environment for scholars and fellows. The college therefore admits students to read all subjects except land economy and theology & religious studies (though it is possible to switch to these subjects later).

The first postgraduate students arrived in October 1960, and the first undergraduates a year later. Full college status was received in 1966. Initially all students were male. Women were not accepted as undergraduates until 1972.

The bias towards science and engineering remains as policy to the current day, with the statutes requiring approximately 70% science and technology students amongst its student intake each year. The college statutes also stipulate that one third of the students of the college should be studying for postgraduate qualification.

Cambridge University Radio (later Cam FM) broadcast from Churchill College from 1979 until 2011.

On 27 October 2020, the college launched Churchill, Empire and Race, intended as a year-long programme looking critically at its founder. However in June 2021, the programme was abruptly terminated following a dispute with the college’s leadership.

Buildings and grounds 
In 1958, a 42-acre (170,000 m2) site was purchased to the west of the city centre, which had previously been farmland. After a competition, Richard Sheppard was appointed to design the new college. Building was completed by 1968 with nine main residential courts, separate graduate flats and a central building consisting of the dining hall, buttery, combination rooms and offices.

The dining hall is the largest in Cambridge. It measures 22m square, 9m to the base of the vault beams, and 11.6m to the highest point. It can cater for up to 430 guests in a formal dining arrangement.

The main college buildings and courtyards are arranged around a large central space, in which the library was placed. Only a few years later, being opened in 1974, an extension to the library building was added to house the Churchill Archives Centre. Its original purpose was to provide a home to Sir Winston's papers, however since then it has been endowed with papers from other political figures including former Prime Ministers Margaret Thatcher and John Major, as well as former Leader of the Opposition Neil Kinnock, and those of eminent scientists and engineers including Reginald Victor Jones, Rosalind Franklin and Sir Frank Whittle.

In 1992, the Møller Centre for Continuing Education was built on the Churchill site, designed by Henning Larsen. It is a dedicated residential executive training and conference centre, aiming to bring together education and commerce.

As well as the main College buildings, Sheppard designed a separate group of flats, known as the Sheppard flats, for the use of married graduate students. These are located to one side of the College grounds, a short distance from the main buildings. The college's central buildings and chapel were Grade II listed in 1993.

Chapel 
At the farthest end of the college grounds is the chapel. Sheppard's original design placed it within the main building complex near the college main entrance. The idea of having a religious building within a modern, scientifically-oriented academic institution deeply annoyed some of the original fellows, leading to the resignation of Nobel Prize winner Francis Crick in protest. Eventually a compromise was found: the chapel was sited just to the west of the Sheppard Flats, and funded and managed separately from the rest of the College itself, being tactfully referred to as "the Chapel at Churchill College". The chimney of the heating system at the front of the college substitutes visually for the missing chapel tower.

Crick had agreed to become a fellow on the basis that no chapel be placed at Churchill. A donation was later made by Lord Beaumont of Whitley to Churchill College for the establishment of one, and the majority of fellows voted in favour of it. Sir Winston Churchill wrote to him saying that no-one need enter the chapel unless they wished to do so, and therefore it did not need to be a problem. Crick, in short order, replied with a letter dated 12 October 1961 accompanied by a cheque for 10 guineas saying that, if that were the case, the enclosed money should be used for the establishment of a brothel. This story was repeated by Crick in an interview with Matt Ridley (Crick's biographer), quotes from which are reported in The Daily Telegraph.

Artworks and sculptures 

The college contains many examples of modern artwork including:
 Four-Square (Walk Through) (1966) – Dame Barbara Hepworth
 Prints of Marilyn Monroe – Andy Warhol
 Gemini (1973) – Denis Mitchell
 Diagram of an Object (Second state) (1990) – Dhruva Mistry
 Spiral – Michael Gillespie (1993)
 Flight – Peter Lanyon (1981)
 Black Bag – Graham Murdoch (1990)
 Past, Present, Future - Geoffrey Clarke (2010)
There are also works by Sir Eduardo Paolozzi, Bridget Riley, Patrick Caulfield, Sir Peter Blake, and Daphne Hardy Henrion.

Hepworth's Four-Square (Walk Through) stands at the West Door, the west exit of the main college complex. In 1968, it replaced an earlier Hepworth sculpture, Squares with Two Circles (BH 347) which had been sold to a private collector. Two sculptures by Nigel Hall stand in front of the main gate of the college: The Now (1999) and Southern Shade I (2010). Mistry's Diagram of an Object (Second state) used to be found at the front of college, but is now located next to the chapel at the far end of the college. Sir Anthony Caro's Forum used to stand near the front gate of the college but it was removed in 2004 and replaced in 2007 by Lynn Chadwick's Beast Alerted 1.

Student life 
The student population is divided into two common rooms: the Junior Common Room (JCR) and Middle Common Room (MCR). The former contains undergraduates and the latter postgraduates (known as advanced students). Fourth year undergraduates studying towards their Masters may choose to be in either. These student bodies organise various academic and social events as well as handling issues regarding welfare. The college funds sports clubs and societies which provide entertainment for students.

Social events 
Every two weeks of the Michaelmas and Lent terms, and twice in Easter term, Churchill is host to Pav, a music event unusual for Cambridge events in that it is free and open to all university members. The name Pav originates from the pavilion buildings of the college where the event was originally held. Since 1992, Pav has been held in the Buttery, the main bar area.

In the early years of the college's foundation, the college held a ball in May Week, in common with many older colleges. However, more recently Churchill has held a Spring Ball every February, close to Valentine's Day. The Ball has hosted a number of upcoming bands, such as The Wombats (2007) and The Noisettes (2008).

During May Week the JCR organise a free garden party. The event hosts performances from local bands and musicians.

Students of the College run Churchill Casino, a Cambridge-based enterprise which provides professional casinos at various social events. Churchill Casino is frequently hired for Cambridge May Balls as well as balls at the University of Oxford and corporate events throughout the country. Profits have been donated back towards the college and to local charities.

The MCR has its own reserved area, the Sandy Ashmore Room, where students may socialise. This incorporates a student-run bar known as the Vicious Penguin. The MCR organises a range of activities including an annual conference, the Conference on Everything, and hosts termly Guest Nights. The Conference on Everything gives students an opportunity to present their own research as well as featuring talks from distinguished speakers including Salah Al-Shaikhly, the Iraqi ambassador to the United Kingdom; Michael Green, Lucasian Professor and pioneer of string theory; Julian Huppert, scientist and Member of Parliament (MP) for Cambridge; David Spiegelhalter, Winton Professor of the Public Understanding of Risk, and Nicholas Bingham, Senior Investigator at Imperial College London and Visiting Professor of Mathematics at the London School of Economics.

Sport 

With playing fields on site, unlike many other colleges, sport is an integral part of the college. As well as football pitches, a cricket pitch and others, the facilities include a gym, and tennis and squash courts.

Churchill College Football Club (CCFC) were the first college team to retain the Cambridge University Amateur Football League Division 1 title, winning it in 2005–06 and 2006–07. In the 2006–2007 season they also reached the final of Cuppers.

The college also has a successful boat club (Churchill College Boat Club) which in 2013 won the Pegasus Cup (This trophy is awarded annually to the most successful college boat club competing in the Cambridge May Bumping Races). In 2015, Churchill College Boat Club made history by being the first boat club at the university to win both the Pegasus Cup and Marconi Cup (This award is present to the most successful college boat club in the Lent Bumps) in the same year.

Traditions 

Churchill is a relatively young college, and prides itself on being modern and forward looking. It has relatively few traditions. Informal hall (cafeteria-style dining period) was introduced in 1971, as an alternative to formal hall (fixed time, waiter service, all diners wearing gowns), but students are no longer required to wear gowns at formal halls, with exception of certain college feasts.

In special formal meals such as Matriculation Dinner or Scholars' Feast the Master usually raises a toast, first to The Queen and then to "Sir Winston". In other formal halls this is usually made by a senior student once the fellows have left. This latter tradition started in the early 2000s with the students customarily toasting in the reverse order: "Sir Winston", followed by "The Queen".

People associated with the college

Masters 
The Mastership of Churchill College is a Crown appointment. To date the college has had seven masters:

Notable fellows 
See also :Category:Fellows of Churchill College, Cambridge
 Michael Ashburner – Biologist, former head of the European Bioinformatics Institute and the European Molecular Biology Laboratory
 Correlli Barnett – Military historian
 Jacques Barzun – Historian and cultural critic; (Extraordinary Fellow at Churchill while also Provost, Dean of Graduate studies, and Dean of Faculties at Columbia.)
 Piers Brendon – Writer and historian
 Edward Bullard – Geophysicist, former head of the National Physical Laboratory
 Edward Craig – Philosopher
 James Fox - Art historian and broadcaster
 George Gamow – Cosmologist (overseas fellow)
 Mark Goldie - Professor of Intellectual History
 Priya Gopal - Teaching fellow in colonial and postcolonial literature
 Frank Hahn – Economist
 Archie Howie – Physicist
 Richard Keynes – Physiologist
 Julia King, Baroness Brown of Cambridge - Engineer, former Vice-Chancellor of Aston University
 John Kinsella – Poet and novelist
 Nigel Knight - Economist and political scientist
David Luscombe - Medieval historian
 C. B. Macpherson – Political scientist
 Peter Murray-Rust – Chemist
 David Newbery – Economist
 David Olive - Physicist
 Nick Petford - Geologist and Vice-Chancellor of the University of Northampton
 Roy Porter – Historian and prolific author
 Stephen Roskill – Naval historian
 Andrew Sinclair – Historian, novelist and journalist
 C. P. Snow – Physicist and novelist
 Franz Sondheimer - Organic chemist
 George Steiner – Literary critic and linguistic theorist (Extraordinary Fellow at Churchill)
 Sir Colin St John Wilson – Architect
 David Spiegelhalter – Statistician
 Dick Tizard – Engineer
 Frank Gibbs Torto – Chemist
 Melissa Hines – Neuroscientist
 Stuart Warren – Organic chemist
 Chandra Wickramasinghe – Physicist and Astrobiologist
 Michael Young – Sociologist and politician
 Ghil'ad Zuckermann – Linguist and revivalist
 Sander van der Linden – Psychologist

Nobel laureates

 Philip Warren Anderson – Physics, for the behaviour of electrons in magnetic solids, 1977
 John Cockcroft – Physics, for using accelerated particles to study atomic nuclei, 1951
 Francis Crick – co-discoverer of the structure of DNA, Physiology or Medicine, 1962
 Angus Deaton – Economics, 2015 (Overseas Fellow 1990–1): Analysis of consumption, poverty, and welfare
 Gérard Debreu – Economics, 1983
 Peter Diamond – Economics, 2010 (overseas fellow)
 Robert G. Edwards – Physiology or Medicine, 2010
 John Gurdon – Physiology or Medicine, 2012
 Antony Hewish – co-discoverer of pulsars, Physics, 1974
 William Lipscomb – Chemistry, 1976 (overseas fellow)
 Mario Vargas Llosa – Literature, 2010 (overseas fellow)
 Eric Maskin – Economics, 2007 (overseas fellow)
Paul Nurse - Physiology or Medicine, 2001
 Wole Soyinka – Literature, 1986 (overseas fellow)
 David Thouless – Physics, 2016 (Fellow 1961–5): Theoretical discoveries of topological phase transitions and topological phases of matter.
 Roger Tsien – Chemistry, 2008

Notable alumni 
See also :Category:Alumni of Churchill College, Cambridge
 
 Kari Blackburn – BBC World Service executive
 Baroness Brinton – Liberal Democrat peer
 Nick Brown - Principal of Linacre College, Oxford
 Michael Burrows – inventor of the first internet search machine, Alta Vista
 Peter Fincham – former controller, BBC1
 Sir Christopher Frayling – writer and educationalist
 Mike Gascoyne – Chief technical officer of the Caterham F1 Formula One team
 Sir Peter Gershon – author of the Gershon Review, chairman of Premier Farnell and Symbian Ltd.
 John Gladwin – Bishop of Chelmsford and Chair of Citizens Advice
 Catherine Green – biologist who worked on the production of the Oxford–AstraZeneca COVID-19 vaccine
 Michael Green – Lucasian Professor of Mathematics
 Charlie Hannaford – England rugby player
 Geoffrey M. Heal – Columbia University environmental economist
 Roger Helmer – UK Independence Party MEP
Tim Jenkinson - Professor of Finance at the Saïd Business School
 Michael Li – Founder, The Data Incubator and data scientist
 Diarmaid MacCulloch – Historian
 Viscount Monckton – barrister and policy advisor to Margaret Thatcher
 Christine E. Morris- Andrew A. David Professor in Greek Archaeology and History at Trinity College Dublin
 Simeon Nyachae – Kenyan minister and 2002 presidential candidate
 Brendan O'Neill – business executive
 James Owen - Theoretical Astrophysicist 
 Andrew Parker - Lord Chamberlain, former Director General of the Security Service (MI5)
 Luke Roberts – comedian
 Philip Sales - Supreme Court Justice
 Mark Smith - Academic, Vice-Chancellor of Lancaster University
 Ian Stewart – Mathematician
 Gavin Strang – Labour Member of Parliament (MP)
 Bjarne Stroustrup – inventor of C++
 Sir John Stuttard – a Lord Mayor of London
 Fabian Tassano – Economist and author
 Geoffrey Thomas – Former President of Kellogg College, Oxford
 Geoff Travis – Founder of Rough Trade Records label and shops
 Neil Turok – Mathematician
 Stephen Tweedie – Software developer
 Peter Wadhams - Oceanographer and glaciologist
 Rick Warden – Actor Band of Brothers, Rome
 Jeremy Warmsley – musician

See also 
 Churchill Scholarships for fourteen graduates from the United States.
 Churchill College Boat Club

References

External links 

 College Website
 Churchill College JCR
 Churchill College MCR
 Churchill College SCR
 Archives Centre

 
Colleges of the University of Cambridge
Winston Churchill
Educational institutions established in 1958
1958 establishments in England